Toronto Underground may refer to:

PATH (Toronto), network of underground pedestrian tunnels in Toronto, Canada
Toronto subway, rapid transit system in Toronto, Canada